Barrington Beach is a beach located in Barrington, Rhode Island, United States. It has  of beachfront overlooking Narragansett Bay. It is located in the East Bay region of Rhode Island.

The beach went under massive construction in 2011, after changing the design and water supply because of Providence dumping their waste and sewage into the waters of the bay. The construction ended in May 2014.

Barrington, Rhode Island
Beaches of Rhode Island
Landforms of Bristol County, Rhode Island